Kazakhstan competed in the 2017 Asian Winter Games in Sapporo and Obihiro, Japan from February 19 to 26. Kazakhstan competed in all five sports (eleven disciplines). The team consists of 116 athletes and was announced on January 17.

Also on January 17 in conjunction with the team announcement, cross-country skier Yerdos Akhmadiyev was announced as the country's flagbearer during the parade of nations at the opening ceremony. Akhmadiyev also served as the country's flagbearer at the 2014 Winter Olympics in Sochi, Russia.

Medal summary

Medal table

Medalists

Competitors
The following table lists the Kazakh delegation per sport and gender.

Alpine skiing

Kazakhstan's alpine skiing team consists of four athletes (two men and two women).

Men
Igor Zakurdayev
Martin Khuber

Women
Yekaterina Karpova
Mariya Grigorova

Biathlon

Kazakhstan's biathlon team consists of ten athletes (five men and five women).

Men
Maxim Braun
Anton Pantov
Vassiliy Podkorytov
Yan Savitskiy
Vladislav Vitenko

Women
Anna Kistanova
Olga Poltoranina
Darya Usanova
Galina Vishnevskaya
Alina Raikova

Cross-country skiing

Kazakhstan's cross-country skiing team consists of twelve athletes (six men and six women).

Men
Yerdos Akhmadiyev
Nikolay Chebotko
Alexandr Malyshev
Sergey Malyshev
Rinat Mukhin
Sergey Cherepanov

Women
Tamara Ebel
Yelena Kolomina
Marina Matrossova
Darya Ryazhko
Angelina Shuryga
Anzhelika Tarassova

Curling

Kazakhstan has entered both a men's and women's teams, each consists of five athletes, for a total of ten.

Men's tournament

Viktor Kim – skip
Abylaikhan Zhuzbay – third
Dimitriy Garagul – second
Muzdybay Kudaibergenov – lead
Abilay Nurumbetov – alternate

Round-robin
Kazakhstan has a bye in draw 3

Draw 1 
Saturday, February 18, 9:00

Draw 2
Saturday, February 18, 18:00

Draw 4
Monday, February 20, 13:30

Draw 5
Tuesday, February 21, 9:00

Draw 6
Tuesday, February 21, 18:00

Women's tournament

The women's team consists of five athletes.

Ramina Yunicheva – skip
Anastassiya Surgay – third
Kamila Bakanova – second
Diana Torkina – lead
Sitora Alliyarova – alternate

Round-robin
Kazakhstan has a bye in draw 4

Draw 1 
Saturday, February 18, 13:30

Draw 2
Saturday, February 19, 9:00

Draw 3
Sunday, February 20, 9:00

Draw 5
Tuesday, February 21, 13:30

Figure skating

Kazakhstan's figure skating team consists of four athletes (two men and two women).

Singles

Freestyle skiing

Kazakhstan's freestyle skiing team consists of four athletes (three men and one woman).

Men
Dmitriy Barmashov
Dmitry Reiherd
Oleg Tsinn

Woman
Ayaulum Amrenova

Ice hockey

Kazakhstan has entered teams in both hockey tournaments. The men's team will compete in the top division.

Men's tournament

Kazakhstan was represented by the following 23 athletes: 

Sergei Kudryavtsev (G)
Pavel Poluektov (G)
Valeri Sevidov (G)
Vladislav Grebenshchikov (D)
Madiyar Ibraibekov (D)
Viktor Ivashin (D)
Aleksandr Nurek (D)
Alexander Pisarev (D)
Ivan Stepanenko (D)
Stanislav Zinchenko (D)
Nursultan Belgibayev (F)
Artem Burdelev (F)
Dmitri Grents (F)
Artyom Likhotnikov (F)
Nikita Mikhailis (F)
Vladislav Nikulin (F)
Anton Petrov (F)
Mikhail Rakhmanov (F)
Konstantin Savenkov (F)
Anton Sagadiev (F)
Kirill Savitsky (F)
Arkadi Shestakov (F)
Yaroslav Yevdokimov (F)

Legend
G– Goalie D = Defense-man F = Forward

Women's tournament

Kazakhstan was represented by the following 21 athletes:

Darya Dmitriyeva (G)
Aizhan Raushanova (G)
Arina Schekolova (G)
Alexandra Feklistova (D)
Azhar Khamimuldinova (D)
Olga Konysheva (D)
Viktoriya Sazonova (D)
Galiya Nurgaliyeva (D)
Malika Aldabergenova (F)
Pernesh Ashimova (F)
Karina Felzink (F)
Alena Fux (F)
Bulbul Kartanbayeva (F)
Tatyana Koroleva (F)
Tatyana Likhaus (F)
Aida Olzhabayeva (F)
Anastasia Orlova (F)
Meruyert Ryspek (F)
Arai Shegebayeva (F)
Zarina Tukhtieva (F)
Madina Tursynova (F)

Legend
G– Goalie D = Defense-man F = Forward

Short track speed skating

Kazakhstan's short track speed skating team consists of ten athletes (five men and five women).

Men
Aidar Bekzhanov
Adil Galiakhmetov
Nurtilek Kazhgali
Yerkebulan Shamukhanov
Mersaid Zhaksybaev

Women
Iong A Kim
Anastassiya Krestova
Anita Nagay
Olga Tikhonova
Madina Zhanbussinova

Ski jumping

Kazakhstan's ski jumping team consists of four male athletes.

Men
Marat Zhaparov
Sabirzhan Muminov
Sergey Tkachenko
Konstantin Sokolenko

Snowboarding

Kazakhstan's snowboarding skiing team consists of four athletes (two men and two women). All four will compete in the alpine events.

Speed skating

Kazakhstan's speed skating team consists of ten athletes (six men and four women).

Men
Dmitry Babenko
Artem Krikunov
Roman Krech
Denis Kuzin
Fyodor Mezentsev
Stanislav Palkin

Women
Yekaterina Aydova
Nadezhda Sidelnik
Mariya Sizova
Elena Urvanceva

References

Nations at the 2017 Asian Winter Games
Kazakhstan at the Asian Winter Games
2017 in Kazakhstani sport